Nella Brambatti (26 January 1949 – 12 November 2020) was an Italian politician.

Former member of the Italian Communist Party, she joined the Democratic Party in 2007 and ran for Mayor of Fermo at the 2011 Italian local elections. She was elected at the first round and took office on 20 May 2011.

Brambatti resigned on 21 February 2015 after an internal government crisis.

See also
2011 Italian local elections
List of mayors of Fermo

References

External links
 

1949 births
2020 deaths
Mayors of places in Marche
People from Fermo
Democratic Party (Italy) politicians
Democratic Party of the Left politicians
Democrats of the Left politicians
Italian Communist Party politicians